Adrian LeRoy (born May 6, 1987) is a Canadian former soccer player.

Career

College and Amateur
LeRoy began his college career at Carleton University in 2005, leading the team to an Ontario University Championship.  After one season there, he moved to the University of Maine where he played 15 games in 2006 and was named 2006 University of Maine Scholar Athlete Rising Star.  In 2007, LeRoy redshirted his sophomore year after transferring to Old Dominion University.  In 2008, he played in 10 games and scored one goal against George Mason.  In 09', he finished the year with two assists.

During his college years LeRoy also played for the Hampton Roads Piranhas and the Ottawa Fury in the USL Premier Development League.

Professional
On April 19, 2011, LeRoy signed with NASL side FC Edmonton.

LeRoy join Harrisburg City Islanders in 2012 before returning to Edmonton for the 2013 season. In 2014, he returned to Ottawa and went on trial with his newly-professional former club, the Ottawa Fury FC, but was not signed.

Post-retirement
After retiring from soccer LeRoy began working as a wealth advisor, as he had earned his honours degree in economics from Old Dominion University.

References

External links
Old Dominion bio

1987 births
Living people
Canadian soccer players
Soccer players from Montreal
Canadian expatriate soccer players
Maine Black Bears men's soccer players
Old Dominion Monarchs men's soccer players
Ottawa Fury (2005–2013) players
Virginia Beach Piranhas players
FC Edmonton players
Penn FC players
Expatriate soccer players in the United States
USL League Two players
North American Soccer League players
USL Championship players
Association football defenders
Carleton Ravens
Canadian expatriate sportspeople in the United States
University and college soccer players in Canada